Sueños y Pesadillas del Tercer Mundo is the debut album of The Dominican rock group, Toque Profundo. The album was released independently with only the band's members financial help. The album helped them become tops In the mainstream rock of the Dominican Republic and was a total success. Songs Like "El Gevito", "Mi País", and "Amigo" became hits and reached the top of the charts closely to the album's release date..

Most of the songs by Toque Profundo in this album relate to the Country's economic or social situation, and the songs talked about things that were only nationally known but not around the globe which made fame outside the Dominican Republic difficult for TP. Some examples are the song "Mi País" (My Country) which describes certain aspects of life in the Dominican Republic, "El Gevito" (fashion-obsessed Dominican young men) which were part of the Dominican popular culture in the '80s, and "El Bolero Del Bionico" which describes the adventures and perils on riding in a cheap taxi ride.

Track listing

 Mi País
 Mandela
 Abril
 El Bolero del Biónico
 Y Soñó
 Amigo
 Latidos
 Infarto al Miocardio
 El Jevito
 Mandela (Demo)

References

1992 debut albums
Toque Profundo albums